Nabo Gass (25 August 1954 in Ebingen, Germany) is a German painter and glass artist. He is counted among the artists who show innovative perspective in their association with glass.

Life 
1973 Nabo Gass set out on a journey through Italy to find answers for his future and he did. It was the colorful and luminous stained glass painting by Lorenzo Ghiberti in the Florentine Cathedral Santa Maria del Fiore. After a classical education as a glass painter, he studied in the 1970s at the Wiesbaden School of Liberal Arts and at the Academy of Arts in Berlin. In the mid 1980s he founded the “Atelier Transparent” in Wiesbaden, where he presently lives and works. Glass has been the focus of his artistic endeavors since 1986. Numerous exhibitions and commissions in Germany and abroad as well as work in the private and public sector have made his glass art famous.
The subject of his work finds its origins in real life: defining experiences, revolutionary encounters, shocking news and the contradictions of our complex world.

Work 
Nabo Gass’ merit lies in the homogeneous relationship of his particular partly autobiographic, partly ordinary world of experience with his own technical inventions in one of the presently barley examined area of general art science, that of stained glass painting. His works are a kaleidoscopic collection of the happy and sad aspects of life, reality and everything belonging to it. They are everyday thoughts put into pictures which, as such, linger in the mind of the observer.

Technique 
Nabo Gass paints with glass – he mixes glue with glass powder into a paste, applies it thickly with a spatula or brush, creating structures with relief, enabling a multilevel construction. In the burning process the colors melt with the support glass but not into one another, so that their composition, color nuances, shading and contrasts are preserved as well as individual brush strokes and spatula distributions.
Placing his colorful motifs in the middle of the picture on different levels of the sandblasted support glass is characteristic.

The edges of the composition are predominantly non-treated and transparent, so that the surroundings are projected into the work itself. The transparency of glass allows him to express his thoughts and experiences in a single picture. The pictures are made with two or more panes in back of each other, but connected. Each single pane is distinctly fashioned and the final result of a unique impression. Connecting the panes into a single work makes it possible for Nabo Gass to unite his past experiences with the present and to confront them. Not until one views the work as a whole do the overlapping panes blend into an all-round impression, corresponding to a human sense of reality, because a reciprocity exists between the overlapping experienced impressions or sensations. Nabo Gass considers the conventional picture isolated in its own world. The glass picture, on the other hand, is an effort to come to an understanding with its surroundings. His pictures change according to their surroundings and light. Because the background is not entirely composed of the work itself, the composition is pulled into real space, becoming reality itself. This is in keeping with the theme of the artist’s work because they are taken from life, they are immanent.

Works in architecture 
In addition to autonomous glass pictures, Gass has created many interiors with glass doors, luminous ceilings and room dividers. The designs convey a harmonious relationship in its placement and create a strong tie between its environment and the people within it.

He has also immersed himself in the field of solar technology and designed the façade of a high bay warehouse in Coeseld-Lette using photovoltaic modules.
The warehouse's folded design of the solar modules extends vertically, bending over the roof and hovering on a framed mounted system above the landscaped roof. The facade is constructed out of deep-black solar modules and greenish-blue sparkling crash glass, two contrasting components generating an electrifying force. The folding effect arises from the installation of the two main elements on the solar facade: alternating, solar modules and crash glass are arranged gradually in a 32° angle of inclination, which guarantees an optimal solar radiation at the geographical location of Coesfeld.
This folded, cascading arrangement of the PV-modules not only optimally uses the sun’s energy, but also provides shade for the glass building behind it. The interior of the warehouse requires no additional cooling. In winter, when the sun is low and the rays are flat, the shading effect is limited and consequently heating is not necessary. As a result, the warehouse can be operated with only an automatic ventilation system. A unique and exemplary symbiosis of engineering and design, his artistic approach to the photovoltaic facade received the architecture award of the Stiftung Deutsche Pfandbriefbank.
His highly innovative method of fusing a crash glass picture into single pane safety glass without the use of additional adhesives is patented.

Works for public places (selection) 
 high-rise warehouse, Coesfeld, Germany
 Metro GlassTech, New Zealand
 etamRetail Services, The Hague, The Netherlands
 Ernsting Art Collection, Coesfeld, Germany
 Aventis Pharma, Bad-Soden, Germany
 Via Publica and Kurhaus, Wiesbaden, Germany
 Deutsche Pfandbriefbank, Frankfurt, Germany
 Deutsches Museum für Glasmalerei, Linnich, Germany
 DGB, Otto-Brenner-Denkmal, Hannover, Germany

Quotes 
“No other material tolerates such an ingenious and conscious realization which we commonly accept as ambivalence. Glass is not only transparent, giving perspective and vision, it also connects various levels and visualizes the complexity and diversity of life.” Nabo Gass

Critical opinions 

“The art of Nabo Gass are sophistic parables of being. The comprehensible and enigmatic are cognate to each other by ever changing emphasis and interpretive reversal.”
Dorothee Baer-Bogenschütz, journalist and art historian

“The persuasive power of Nabo Gass’ artwork is manifested in the symbiosis of glass and painting. The previous terms of art literature are no longer suitable. What we see in his images is neither painting on glass nor is it painted glass. It is painting with glass. A new quality of art comes to light.”
Andreas Greulich, gallery owner and art historian

Awards (selection) 

 2014 Architectural award from BDA Münsterland
 2012 Architectural award for a solar facade (Stiftung Deutsche Pfandbriefbank), Coesfeld-Letten (Germany)
 2008 Sculpturcompetition, Mörfelden (Germany)
 2000 Innovation award, Glastec Düsseldorf (Germany)
 1999 New Glass Review 21, Corning Museum New York (USA)
 1983 Art foundation, Bonn (Germany)

Publications (selection) 
 2018 "Meisterwerke der Glaskunst im 20. Jahrhundert", Dr. Iris Nestler, B. Kühnen-Verlag, Band 2, S. 235 ff, 
 2015 "Ausgezeichnete Baukunst“, Callwey Verlag, Hrsg. Bundesarchitektenkammer, S. 146 ff, 
 2014 "Nabo, Spiegelungen",  Dorothee Baer-Bogenschütz, Ulrike Hoppe-Oehl, Simone Kraft, Uferatelier Gabi Gass,
 2005 „Broken Glass“ - Glas in Kunst und Architektur, Wienand-Verlag, 2005, S. 86ff, 
 2000 „nabo gaß BildErFinder“ Deutsches Glasmalerei-Museum, 2000, 
 1986 „Wir machen Druck“, Steidl Verlag, 1986, 
 1980 „Künstlerhäuser“ in „Kunst und Öffentlichkeit“, Elefanten Press Berlin, 1980,

References

Further reading 
 2012 »Form, function and a show«, Photon International Issue 8
 2010 „Dialogue in Architectur“, Exhibition catalogue, Gallery SKLO (South Korea)
 2004 „pas de deux“, Exhibition catalogue
 2002 „nabo gaß à la sorbonne“, Exhibition catalogue
 1989 „Gewerkschaftliche Kulturarbeit“ in „14 Stunden Kunst“, Bildungswerk des BBK Berlin (Germany)
 1987 „synthetisches Zeichnen“ in „wfk 1972-1987“
 1981 „Der Künstler als Fachmann“ in „Künstler und Kulturarbeit“, Berlin University of the Arts, Berlin (Germany)

External links 
 Official website
 BBK
 Article Worlds of Adventure in Glass
 
 Deutsches Glasmalerei-Museum
 Artists Portrait / kunstmarkt.com

20th-century German painters
20th-century German male artists
German male painters
German glass artists
1954 births
Living people
21st-century German painters
21st-century German male artists